Andrey Dundukov (b. November 12, 1966) is a Soviet/Russian Nordic combined skier who competed from 1985 to 1992. He won two medals at the FIS Nordic World Ski Championships with silver in the 15 km individual (1989) and a bronze in the 3x10 km team (1987).

Dundukov finished 12th in the individual event at the 1988 Winter Olympics in Calgary. He won the Nordic combined event at the 1990 Holmenkollen ski festival and earned one additional career victory in 1986.

External links

Holmenkollen winners since 1892 - click Vinnere for downloadable pdf file 

1966 births
Living people
Nordic combined skiers at the 1988 Winter Olympics
Nordic combined skiers at the 1992 Winter Olympics
Holmenkollen Ski Festival winners
Soviet male Nordic combined skiers
Olympic Nordic combined skiers of the Soviet Union
Olympic Nordic combined skiers of the Unified Team
FIS Nordic World Ski Championships medalists in Nordic combined